Lučica (Serbian Cyrillic: Лучица) is a village near the city of Požarevac in Central Eastern Serbia.

Villages in Serbia